The Eureka & Palisade Railroad was a  narrow gauge railroad constructed in 1873-1875 between Palisade and Eureka, Nevada, a distance of approximately .  The railroad was constructed to connect Eureka, the center of a rich silver mining area, with the national railway network at Palisade.

Later corporate reorganizations brought on by financial difficulties saw the line operated as the "Eureka and Palisade Railway" and the "Eureka Nevada Railway."

The Eureka & Palisade Railroad was built in 1875 to carry silver-lead ore from Eureka, Nevada, to the Southern Pacific Railroad trunk line that ran through Palisade. Nevertheless, despite the determined and colorful management style of John Sexton, the line succumbed to the effects of flood, fire, competing road traffic, and dwindling amounts of ore extracted in Eureka. The rails and rolling stock of the last surviving narrow gauge railroad in Nevada were removed in 1938.

The Eureka, one of the railroad's only surviving steam locomotives, is listed on the United States National Register of Historic Places.
Another locomotive that has survived is #7, a  Prairie named Pufferbilly that was built in 1915 by the H.K. Porter Company.  It is privately owned by Gary Norton and can be seen at Silverwood Theme Park in Athol, Idaho where it runs daily during theme park operation.

Steam Locomotives 

https://utahrails.net/articles/mason-onward.php

Notes

References

External links
A Guide to the Eureka-Nevada Railway Company Records, NC02. Special Collections, University Libraries, University of Nevada, Reno
Locomotives of the Eureka & Palisades Railroad and Railway from PacificNG

Defunct Nevada railroads
3 ft gauge railways in the United States
Narrow gauge railroads in Nevada
Companies established in 1873
Railway lines closed in 1938
1875 establishments in Nevada